Synchysite-(Ce) is a carbonate mineral and an end member of the synchysite group.

Discovery and naming
Synchysite-(Ce) was discovered in 1900 by Gustaf Flink. The name is derived from the Greek "σύγχΰσις", meaning "confounding", a reference to the possibility to confuse the mineral with Parisite-(Ce).

Occurrences 
Synchysite-(Ce) is found in rare-earth element bearing pegmatites. It can also occur as a hydrothermal mineral in granite, alkalic syenite and carbonatite.

References

Carbonate minerals
Monoclinic minerals
Minerals in space group 15